Ayaru may refer to:
 a month in the Babylonian calendar
 an old name for what is now Phú Yên province in Vietnam